Kennedy GO Station is a GO Transit train station in Toronto, Ontario, Canada. It is a stop on the Stouffville line GO train service, and is directly connected to the adjacent Kennedy subway station which serves the Line 2 Bloor–Danforth and Line 3 Scarborough lines, as well as numerous TTC bus services.

History
Kennedy GO Station opened June 2, 2005.

Despite being on the CN Uxbridge Subdivision and preceding operators dating to the 19th century, there was never a station near this location.

Facilities
GO Transit does not provide any parking at the station. Pay parking is available in the adjacent TTC and City of Toronto parking lots.

There is no permanent station building, only shelters along the platform. There is no staffed ticket booth; tickets are purchased from vending ticketing machines only.

, Metrolinx is making the following station improvements:
 A new station building and entrance on the east side of the tracks.
 A second track and platform with a connecting pedestrian tunnel.
 Platform canopies and platform snowmelt systems.
 Accessibility improvements.
 New passenger pick up and drop off area.

References

External links

GO Transit railway stations
Railway stations in Canada opened in 2005
Railway stations in Toronto
Transport in Scarborough, Toronto
2005 establishments in Ontario